The  is a dogū, a humanoid clay female figurine from the Middle Jōmon period (3,000–2,000 BC), discovered in 1986 in Chino, Nagano Prefecture, Japan. It was designated a National Treasure in 1995, the first Jōmon-period artifact to be so designated.

The clay from which it is made has been carefully polished and contains mica. Its shape is thought to resemble a pregnant woman: broad hips, a pronounced gluteal arch, prominent breasts and an enlarged belly. In contrast to the overwhelming majority of the 20,000 dogū found in Japan, which were fragmented, the Venus of Jōmon is complete and has all its limbs.

History 
This  revealed the vestiges of a village of 149 houses, 146 of which date from the middle Jōmon period. The pieces of obsidian discovered at the site indicate that this village was a prosperous trading center. The figurine was found among the burial pits at the center of the excavation site. It was first named the Tanabatake Venus before acquiring its present name.

In 1989, it was designated an Important Cultural Property before achieving its current status. It is exhibited at the Togariishi Museum of Jōmon Archaeology in Chino.

See also 
 List of National Treasures of Japan (archaeological materials)
 Japanese Prehistoric Art
 Jōmon pottery

References

External links 
 

1986 archaeological discoveries
3rd-millennium BC sculptures
Archaeological artifacts
Japanese sculpture
Jōmon period
National Treasures of Japan
Prehistoric art
Sculptures of women in Japan